The 2019 Geneva Open (sponsored by Banque Eric Sturdza) was a men's tennis tournament played on outdoor clay courts. It was the 17th edition of the Geneva Open and part of the ATP Tour 250 series of the 2019 ATP Tour. It took place at the Tennis Club de Genève in Geneva, Switzerland, from May 19 through May 25, 2019.

Singles main draw entrants

Seeds 

 Rankings are as of May 13, 2019.

Other entrants 
The following players received wildcards into the singles main draw:
  Feliciano López
  Janko Tipsarević
  Stan Wawrinka

The following players received entry from the qualifying draw:
  Grigor Dimitrov
  Damir Džumhur
  Lorenzo Sonego
  Bernabé Zapata Miralles

Withdrawals 
  Matteo Berrettini → replaced by  Denis Kudla
  Laslo Đere → replaced by  Albert Ramos Viñolas
  Fabio Fognini → replaced by  Alexander Zverev
  Robin Haase → replaced by  Mischa Zverev
  Malek Jaziri → replaced by  Federico Delbonis
  Phieiber → replaced by  Peter Gojowczyk
  Daniil Medvedev → replaced by  Taro Daniel
  Jaume Munar → replaced by  Cristian Garín
  Guido Pella → replaced by  Nicolás Jarry

Doubles main draw entrants

Seeds

 Rankings are as of May 13, 2019.

Other entrants
The following pairs received wildcards into the doubles main draw:
  Marc-Andrea Hüsler /  Florin Mergea 
  Johan Nikles /  Nenad Zimonjić

Withdrawals
During the tournament
  Federico Delbonis
  Cristian Garín

Champions

Singles

  Alexander Zverev def.  Nicolás Jarry, 6–3, 3–6, 7–6(10–8)

Doubles

   Oliver Marach /  Mate Pavić def.  Matthew Ebden /  Robert Lindstedt, 6–4, 6–4

References

External links 
 Official website